Carl Henry is a Canadian R&B singer born in Jamaica and raised in Montreal, Quebec, Canada.

His 2002 debut album RNB, earned him his first Juno nomination in 2003 for Best R&B/Soul recording of the Year. He released a French-language version of the album titled Solution RNB.  After touring and promoting the French version the album, he released three singles: "Homie's Girl", dancehall hit "Bare As She Dare" (featuring Ce'cile), and "Hot Gal" (featuring Rally Bop).  The three singles also received Juno nominations.

His second album titled I Wish, was released in the fall of 2005. It featured the single "Little Mama". His song "Perfect" (featuring JR Writer) appeared in Ian Iqbal Rashid's 2007 feature film How She Move.

His third album is entitled All That I Know, and features the hit singles "Trippin'" and "Dim the Lights".

Discography

Albums
2003:  RNB
2003:  Solution RNB (French version of  RNB)
2005:  I Wish

Singles 
"Homie's Girl"
"Bare As She Dare" (featuring Ce'cile)
"Hot Gal" (featuring Rally Bop)
"Little Mama"
"Dim the Lights"

See also 

Music of Canada
Caribbean music in Canada
List of Canadian musicians
List of Montreal musicians
Montreal's music scene

References
Citations

Enternal links
Carl Henry's Official Website
Carl Henry's blog

Date of birth missing (living people)
1974 births
Living people

Jamaican emigrants to Canada
Canadian contemporary R&B singers
Canadian pop singers
Canadian reggae musicians
Singers from Montreal
21st-century Canadian male singers